2-(2-Hydroxyphenyl)-2H-benzotriazoles, also referred to as phenolic benzotriazoles, are an important class of UV absorbers comprising the benzotriazole building block.

Structure 
The molecules are composed of substituted benzotriazoles with a phenyl group in the 2-position, which carries a hydroxy group in the ortho-position.

Use 
2-(2-hydroxyphenyl)-2H-benzotriazoles are used as UV stabilizers in lacquers and plastics.

References 

Benzotriazoles